Budy Rządowe  (translation: Governmental Hovel) is a village in the administrative district of Gmina Jednorożec, within Przasnysz County, Masovian Voivodeship, in east-central Poland.

History

Budy Rządowe (Buda Government in English) was a small nineteenth century settlement of forestry workers. It was located next to Budy Prywatne (Buda Private) a primitive settlement of forest workers dealing in pitch, charcoal, logging, and some farming.

Census figures in 1880 indicate one home and five inhabitants. The post-World War I census, on 30 September 1921, reported 18 homes and 97 residents.

The village is incorporated under the municipality of Gmina Jednorożec, which was established in 1867.

See also
Gmina Jednorożec
Jednorożec

References

Villages in Przasnysz County